Johannes Henricus "Johan" van Maarseveen (3 August 1894 – 18 November 1951) was a Dutch politician of the defunct Roman Catholic State Party (RKSP) and later the Catholic People's Party (KVP) now merged into the Christian Democratic Appeal (CDA) party and jurist.

Early years 
Van Maarseveen applied at the Utrecht University in June 1914 majoring in Law and obtaining a Bachelor of Laws degree in July 1916 before graduating with a Master of Laws degree in July 1920.

Career 
Van Maarseveen worked as a lawyer and prosecutor in Utrecht from August 1920 until September 1937. Van Maarseveen served on the Municipal Council of Utrecht from May 1929 until September 1937 and served as an Alderman in Utrecht from September 1935 until March 1937. Van Maarseveen became a Member of the House of Representatives following the appointment of Carel Goseling as Minister of Justice in the Cabinet Colijn IV, taking office on 21 September 1937. On 10 May 1940 Nazi Germany invaded the Netherlands and the government fled to London to escape the German occupation. During World War II Van Maarseveen continued to serve as a Member of the House of Representatives but in reality the de facto political influence of the House of Representatives was marginalized. Following the end of World War II Queen Wilhelmina ordered a Recall of Parliament and Van Maarseveen remained a Member of the House of Representatives, taking office on 20 November 1945. On 22 December 1945 the Roman Catholic State Party was renamed as the Catholic People's Party.

After the election of 1946 Van Maarseveen was appointed as Minister of Justice in the Cabinet Beel I, taking office on 3 July 1946. After the election of 1948 Van Maarseveen returned as a Member of the House of Representatives, taking office on 27 July 1948. Following the cabinet formation of 1948 Van Maarseveen was appointed as Minister of the Interior in the Cabinet Drees–Van Schaik, taking office on 7 August 1948. Van Maarseveen was appointed as Minister of Colonial Affairs following the resignation Maan Sassen, taking office on 14 February 1949. Van Maarseveen served as acting Minister of Justice from 15 May 1950 until 10 July 1950 following the resignation of René Wijers. The Cabinet Drees–Van Schaik fell on 24 January 1951 and continued to serve in a demissionary capacity until the cabinet formation of 1951 when it was replaced by Cabinet Drees I with Van Maarseveen appointed again as Minister of the Interior, taking office on 15 March 1951.

Death 
On 18 November 1951 Van Maarseveen died after suffering a fatal heart Attack at his home in Utrecht.

Decorations

References

External links

  Mr. J.H. van Maarseveen Parlement & Politiek

1894 births
1951 deaths
Aldermen of Utrecht
Catholic People's Party politicians
Commanders of the Order of Orange-Nassau
Dutch expatriates in Indonesia
Dutch prosecutors
Dutch Roman Catholics
Ministers of Colonial Affairs of the Netherlands
Ministers of Justice of the Netherlands
Ministers of the Interior of the Netherlands
Members of the House of Representatives (Netherlands)
Municipal councillors of Utrecht (city)
Roman Catholic State Party politicians
Utrecht University alumni
20th-century Dutch jurists
20th-century Dutch lawyers
20th-century Dutch politicians